The canton of Renaison is an administrative division of the Loire department, in eastern France. It was created at the French canton reorganisation which came into effect in March 2015. Its seat is in Renaison.

It consists of the following communes: 

Ambierle
Arcon 
Champoly 
Changy 
Chausseterre 
Cherier 
Cremeaux 
Le Crozet 
Juré 
Lentigny 
Noailly 
Les Noës 
Ouches 
La Pacaudière 
Pouilly-les-Nonains 
Renaison 
Sail-les-Bains 
Saint-Alban-les-Eaux 
Saint-André-d'Apchon 
Saint-Bonnet-des-Quarts 
Saint-Forgeux-Lespinasse 
Saint-Germain-Lespinasse
Saint-Haon-le-Châtel 
Saint-Haon-le-Vieux 
Saint-Jean-Saint-Maurice-sur-Loire 
Saint-Just-en-Chevalet 
Saint-Marcel-d'Urfé 
Saint-Martin-d'Estréaux 
Saint-Priest-la-Prugne 
Saint-Rirand 
Saint-Romain-d'Urfé 
Saint-Romain-la-Motte 
La Tuilière 
Urbise 
Villemontais 
Vivans

References

Cantons of Loire (department)